Glycation (sometimes called non-enzymatic glycosylation) is the covalent attachment of a sugar to a protein,  lipid or nucleic acid molecule. Typical sugars that participate in glycation are glucose, fructose, and their derivatives. Glycation is the non-enzymatic process responsible for many (e.g. micro and macrovascular) complications in diabetes mellitus and is implicated in some diseases and in aging. Glycation end products are believed to play a causative role in the vascular complications of diabetes mellitus.

In contrast with glycation, glycosylation is the enzyme-mediated ATP-dependent attachment of sugars to protein or lipid. Glycosylation occurs at defined sites on the target molecule. It is a common form of post-translational modification of proteins and is required for the functioning of the mature protein.

Biochemistry

Glycations occur mainly in the bloodstream to a small proportion of the absorbed simple sugars: glucose, fructose, and galactose. It appears that fructose has approximately ten times the glycation activity of glucose, the primary body fuel.  Glycation can occur through Amadori reactions, Schiff base reactions, and Maillard reactions; which lead to advanced glycation end products (AGEs).

Biomedical implications
Red blood cells have a consistent lifespan of 120 days and are accessible for measurement of glycated hemoglobin. Measurement of HbA1c—the predominant form of glycated hemoglobin—enables medium-term blood sugar control to be monitored in diabetes.

Some glycation product are implicated in many age-related chronic diseases, including cardiovascular diseases (the endothelium, fibrinogen, and collagen are damaged) and Alzheimer's disease (amyloid proteins are side-products of the reactions progressing to AGEs).

Long-lived cells (such as nerves and different types of brain cell), long-lasting proteins (such as crystallins of the lens and cornea), and DNA can sustain substantial glycation over time.  Damage by glycation results in stiffening of the collagen in the blood vessel walls, leading to high blood pressure, especially in diabetes. Glycations also cause weakening of the collagen in the blood vessel walls, which may lead to micro- or macro-aneurysm; this may cause strokes if in the brain.

DNA glycation

The term DNA glycation applies to DNA damage induced by reactive carbonyls (principally methylglyoxal and glyoxal) that are present in cells as by-products of sugar metabolism.  Glycation of DNA can cause mutation, breaks in DNA and cytotoxicity.  Guanine in DNA is the base most susceptible to glycation.  Glycated DNA, as a form of damage, appears to be as frequent as the more well studied oxidative DNA damage.  A protein, designated DJ-1 (also known as PARK7), is employed in the repair of glycated DNA bases in humans, and homologs of this protein have also been identified in bacteria.

See also
 Advanced glycation end-product
 Alagebrium
 Fructose
 Galactose
 Glucose
 Glycosylation
 Glycated hemoglobin
 List of aging processes

Additional reading

References

Carbohydrates
Post-translational modification
Ageing processes